Seth Alexander Kuhn (born April 4, 2000) is an American soccer player who plays as a left midfielder for the Penn State Nittany Lions. In January 2022, Kuhn was selected by the New York Red Bulls in the 2022 MLS SuperDraft with the 73rd overall pick.

Early life
Born in Wyomissing, Pennsylvania, Kuhn grew up playing for local U.S. Soccer Development Academy club PA Classics before joining the Philadelphia Union's YSC Academy in 2015. On December 16, 2016, Kuhn announced that he had committed to playing college soccer at Duke University, joining the Duke Blue Devils for the 2018 season. Prior to attending Duke University, Kuhn was called onto the bench for the Bethlehem Steel, the reserve affiliate for the Philadelphia Union, against Pittsburgh Riverhounds on July 15, 2017. He came on as an 84th minute substitute for Santi Moar as the match ended in a 1–1 draw.

College
Kuhn made his collegiate debut for the Duke Blue Devils on August 24, 2018, against the FIU Panthers. He appeared in 18 matches for the Blue Devils, starting seven, with no goals scored. 

Following the season, on April 2, 2019, it was announced that Kuhn had transferred to Pennsylvania State University and would represent the Penn State Nittany Lions from the 2019 season. The move to the Nittany Lions reunited him with Jeff Cook, his coach while training with the Philadelphia Union academy. He made his Penn State debut on August 30, 2019, starting in a 0–5 defeat against Stanford Cardinal. On September 13, 2019, Kuhn scored his first college goal against the Villanova Wildcats in a 1–0 victory. Throughout his career at Penn State, Kuhn played in 53 matches, scoring 8 goals.

Career

Reading United
During the college soccer offseason, Kuhn joined USL League Two side Reading United for the 2019 season. He made his debut for the side on May 11, 2019, against Lehigh Valley United, scoring the fifth goal in a 5–2 victory. He rejoined the club in 2021, playing in 9 matches and scoring once.

New York Red Bulls
On January 11, 2022, Kuhn was selected with the 73rd overall pick by the New York Red Bulls in the 2022 MLS SuperDraft. Following the draft, Kuhn did not sign a professional contract with the Red Bulls, and instead returned to Pennsylvania State University, joining the Nittany Lions as a graduate student for the 2022 season.

Career statistics

Club

References

External links
 

2000 births
Living people
People from Wyomissing, Pennsylvania
American soccer players
Association football midfielders
Philadelphia Union II players
Duke Blue Devils men's soccer players
Penn State Nittany Lions men's soccer players
USL Championship players
USL League Two players
Soccer players from Pennsylvania
New York Red Bulls draft picks